is a railway station in the city of Fukushima, Fukushima Prefecture, Japan operated by East Japan Railway Company (JR East).

Lines
Minami-Fukushima Station is served by the Tōhoku Main Line, and is located 269.4 rail kilometers from the official starting point of the line at Tokyo Station.

Station layout
The station has two opposed side platforms connected to the station building by a footbridge. The station is staffed.

Platforms

History
The station opened on April 5, 1962, although a signal stop had existed at this location since 1916. The station was absorbed into the JR East network upon the privatization of the Japanese National Railways (JNR) on April 1, 1987.

Passenger statistics
In fiscal 2018, the station was used by an average of 1769 passengers daily (boarding passengers only).

Surrounding area
Fukushima City Hall Tsugitsuma branch office

See also
 List of Railway Stations in Japan

References

External links

  

Stations of East Japan Railway Company
Railway stations in Fukushima Prefecture
Tōhoku Main Line
Railway stations in Japan opened in 1962
Fukushima (city)